Eirin Kristin Sund (born 6 April 1967 in Brønnøysund) is a Norwegian politician for the Labour Party.

She was elected to the Norwegian Parliament from Rogaland in 2005. She had previously served in the position of deputy representative during the term 2001–2005.

Sund held various positions in Gjesdal municipality council from 1987 to 2003, serving as deputy mayor from 1995 to 1999. From 2003 to 2005 she was the deputy county mayor of Rogaland.

During the cabinet Jagland she was appointed political advisor in the Ministry of the Environment. Between 2000 and 2001, during the first cabinet Stoltenberg, she was appointed State Secretary in the Ministry of Transport and Communications.

References

1967 births
Living people
Members of the Storting
Labour Party (Norway) politicians
Norwegian state secretaries
Women members of the Storting
21st-century Norwegian politicians
21st-century Norwegian women politicians
Norwegian women state secretaries
People from Gjesdal